This is a list of universities in Senegal.

Public universities

Private universities
 Amadou Hampaté Bâ University, Dakar
 Dakar Bourguiba University, Dakar
 Euromed Université, Dakar
 Suffolk University Dakar Campus, Dakar
 L'Université de l'Entreprise, Dakar
 Université du Sahel, Dakar
 Université Euro-Afrique, Dakar
 African Institute for Mathematical Sciences, Mbour 
 Dakar American University of Science & Technology, Somone

References 

 
 
 

Universities
Senegal
Senegal